Since the September 11 attacks in the United States in 2001, allegations of Saudi Arabia involvement in the attacks have been made, with the Kingdom of Saudi Arabia (KSA) regularly denying such claims. The 2004 Final Report of the National Commission on Terrorist Attacks Upon the United States "found no evidence that the Saudi government as an institution or senior Saudi officials individually funded Al Qaeda" to conspire in the attacks, or that it funded the attackers. The "report identifies Saudi Arabia as the primary source of al-Qaeda funding", and 15 of the 19 hijackers were Saudi citizens.

In 2012, the FBI stated that it had evidence that Saudi diplomat Fahad al-Thumairy, a Saudi Ministry of Islamic Affairs official and radical cleric who served at the King Fahd Mosque in Los Angeles, and Omar al-Bayoumi (OAB), a suspected Saudi government agent, had supported the 9/11 hijackers. In 2021, the FBI stated that Omar al-Bayoumi was a Saudi Arabian intelligence agent with ties to 9/11 hijackers Nawaf al-Hazmi and Khalid al-Mihdhar when they initially entered into the US. In 2022, the FBI stated that "there is a 50/50 chance al-Bayoumi had advanced knowledge the 9/11 attacks were to occur". Al-Bayoumi also helped the hijackers find housing in San Diego. Al-Bayoumi stated that he simply befriended the hijackers and also denied being a Saudi government agent. The Saudi Arabian government also denied that Al-Bayoumi was an agent.

As a major exporter of oil to the US, the Saudi Arabian government had broad immunity from lawsuits in the US surrounding Saudi Arabia's role in the attacks until the United States District Court for the Southern District of New York allowed a suit against the Saudi Arabian government in March 2018.

Bin Laden 
Osama bin Laden, the leader of Al-Qaeda, the terrorist group that organized the 9/11 attacks, was Saudi Arabian. However, he was banished from Saudi Arabia in 1992, and lost his Saudi citizenship in 1994. He saw the United States as a power behind the throne in several Arab countries, and he strongly disliked the presence of American soldiers in Saudi Arabia.

Investigations and reports

2004 – 9/11 Commission Report 

The Final report of the 9/11 Commission published on July 2004 at the request of Bush Administration and the U.S Congress concluded that there was "no evidence" linking Saudi Arabian government or its senior officials to the 9/11 attacks.

The Commission noted the presence of numerous private donors and sources of fundraising in Saudi Arabia and other Gulf States for Al-Qaeda before 9/11, stating:

July 2016 – File 17 
In July 2016, the U.S. government released a document, compiled by Dana Lesemann and Michael Jacobson, known as "File 17", which contains a list naming three dozen people, including Fahad al-Thumairy, Omar al-Bayoumi, Osama Bassnan, and Mohdhar Abdullah, which connects Saudi Arabia to the hijackers. According to the former Democratic US Senator Bob Graham, "Much of the information upon which File 17 was written was based on what's in the 28 pages."

April 2016 – The 28 pages 

The alleged Saudi role in the September 11 attacks gained new attention after Bob Graham and Porter Goss, former U.S. congressmen and co-chairmen of the Congressional Inquiry into the attacks, told CBS in April 2016 that the redacted 28 pages of the Congressional Inquiry's report refer to evidence of Saudi Arabia's substantial involvement in the execution of the attacks, and calls renewed to have the redacted pages released.

The panel's findings 'did not discover' any role by 'senior, high-level' Saudi government officials, but the "commission's narrow wording", according to critics, suggests the possibility that "less senior officials or parts of the Saudi government could have played a role". Florida Democratic Senator Bob Graham, who chaired the United States Senate Select Committee on Intelligence at the time of the report said in his sworn statements that "there was evidence of support from the Saudi government for the terrorists."

In 2017 a New York lawyer, Jim Kreindler, said that he had found "a link between Saudi officials and the hijackers." In January 2020, it was revealed that the FBI had an investigation named Operation Encore into Saudi Arabian government links to the attacks.

2017 'dry-run' law suite 
According to the New York Post in 2017, the Saudi government was accused of performing a "dry run" by paying two Saudi nationals, al-Qudhaeein and Hamdan al-Shalawi, "living undercover in the US as students, to fly from Phoenix to Washington," two years before the attacks. Evidence submitted in a lawsuit against the Saudi Arabian government revealed that it had funded flights in 1999 to research the flight security weaknesses. Specifically, the suit, citing the FBI documents, alleges the Saudi Arabian government funded two individuals who asked flight attendants technical questions and tried to enter the cockpit of a domestic flight in the US, which caused the flight to make an emergency landing in Ohio and the individuals to be interrogated by the FBI. The two individuals were later released after initial interrogation by the FBI. The complaint alleged based on the FBI documents that the Saudi students were actually Saudi Arabia's agents in the US, and "participated in the terrorist conspiracy". The documents stated that Qudhaeein and Shalawi were trained the in Afghanistan at the same time with some other al-Qaeda operatives that participated in the 9/11 attacks and that "both worked for and received money from the Saudi government, with Qudhaeein employed at the Ministry of Islamic Affairs."

2020 FBI file release 
In April 2020, the FBI neglected to redact one of several instances of the name of Saudi diplomat Mussaed Ahmed al-Jarrah (MAJ) in a court filing in the lawsuit brought by 9/11 families. In 1999–2000 MAJ was a mid-level Saudi Foreign Ministry official who was working in the Saudi Embassy in Washington, DC. Former embassy officials said MAJ reported to the Saudi ambassador to the U.S, Prince Bandar, and managed the employees throughout the United States of the Ministry of Islamic Affairs at Saudi-funded mosques and Islamic centers.

The October 2012 FBI "update" to the FBI's own investigation of possible Saudi involvement in the 9/11 attacks stated that FBI agents had uncovered "evidence" that Saudi diplomat Fahad al-Thumairy, a Saudi Ministry of Islamic Affairs official and radical cleric who served as the imam of the King Fahd Mosque in Los Angeles, and Omar al-Bayoumi (OAB), a suspected Saudi government agent, had been "tasked" to support the 9/11 hijackers by yet another individual, MAJ, whose name was redacted throughout the October 2012 "update" document in all but one instance.  FBI agents suspected that MAJ had directed crucial support for two of the 19 hijackers of 9/11: Khalid al-Mihdhar and Nawaf al-Hazmi, who participated on 9/11 in the hijacking of American Airlines Flight 77.  After Khalid al-Mihdhar and Nawaf al-Hazmiand arrived in Los Angeles on January 15, 2000, and later took flying lessons in San Diego, they were allegedly assisted by Saudi diplomat Fahad al-Thumairy and by OAB. For example, OAB found them an apartment, lent them money, and set them up with bank accounts. Al-Mihdhar and Nawaf al-Hazmi were on the FBI's terrorist-alert list at the time. According to the court declaration of former LA-based FBI agent Catherine Hunt, who is now working with the 9/11 families, during the investigation by the 9/11 Commission, the FBI believed that MAJ was "supporting" and "maintaining" al-Thumairy.

On September 11, 2020, US Magistrate Judge Sarah Netburn ordered two members of the Saudi Arabian royal family, including Prince Bandar bin Sultan, to answer the questions raised under the 9/11 lawsuit. The victims have called it a turning point in a long-running lawsuit. Relatives of the September 11 attack victims claim that the agents of Saudi Arabia knowingly supported al-Qaeda and its leader Osama bin Laden, before hijacking and crashing the planes into New York's World Trade Center Twin Towers.

2021 FBI file release 
On September 11, 2021, following an executive order by Joe Biden, the FBI started releasing a series of redacted documents related to Saudi Arabia's links to 9/11 and the role of Saudi nationals in the attacks. For security purposes, not all the information was released, and the documents were abridged.

The first of these documents, dated to 2016, is heavily redacted. While no direct link between the Saudi Arabian Government and the terrorists were found, the document did state that Omar al-Bayoumi was a Saudi-Arabian intelligence agent that had links to known terrorists, provided significant support to 9/11 hijackers Nawaf al-Hazmi and Khalid al-Mihdhar upon their arrival in the US, and communicated with a key logistics facilitator for Osama bin Laden, each time immediately following significant logistics support to Hazmi and Mihdhar.

Following the documents' release, the Saudi Embassy for the United States issued a statement assuring American officials that the Saudi Government held no role in the attacks, asserting that "No evidence has ever emerged to indicate that the Saudi government or its officials had previous knowledge of the terrorist attack or were in any way involved in its planning or execution".

2022 FBI file release 
The United States Justice Department admitted on March 10 that it would miss a deadline specified by President Joe Biden's executive order to examine and reveal records from the FBI's investigation into the attack.

In March 2022, the FBI declassified a 510-page report about 9/11 that it produced in 2017. The report found that "there is a 50/50 chance al-Bayoumi had advanced knowledge the 9/11 attacks were to occur," from the two Islamists he befriended that were involved in plotting 9/11. Al-Bayoumi also helped the Islamists find housing in San Diego. In response, 9/11 Commission chairman and former New Jersey governor Tom Kean said that "If that's true I'd be upset by it", adding, "The FBI said it wasn't withholding anything and we believed them."

Al-Bayoumi stated that he didn't know anything about the hijackers plans and just befriended them after randomly meeting them. Saudi Arabia stated that al-Bayoumi was not an agent of theirs.

Aftermath
The Saudi government has long denied any connection. Relatives of victims have tried to use the courts to hold Saudi royals, banks, or charities responsible, but these efforts have been thwarted partly by the 1976 Foreign Sovereign Immunities Act. According to Gawdat Bahgat, a professor of political science, following the September 11 attacks the so-called "Saudi policy of promoting terrorism and funding hatred" faced strong criticism by several "influential policy-makers and think-tanks in Washington".

The US government has actively collaborated with the Saudis in suppressing the revelation of evidence of the Saudi government's responsibility for the attacks, denying FOIA requests and supplying inside information to the lawyers representing the Saudis involved. Graham characterises the strategy as not a 'cover up' but "aggressive deception".

JASTA 

In March 2016, Saudi Arabia threatened the Obama administration to sell US$750 billion worth of American assets owned by Saudi Arabia if the Justice Against Sponsors of Terrorism Act (JASTA) designed to create an exception to the 1976 Foreign Sovereign Immunity Act was enacted, which caused fears of destabilizing the US dollar. U.S. president Barack Obama also warned against "unintended consequences", while other economic analysts believed that this action would damage the Saudi government.

The JASTA was enacted, after Barack Obama's veto was overridden by Congress, on September 28, 2016. Although Bernie Sanders and Hillary Clinton publicly supported the proposed legislation, due to 2016 campaign schedule conflicts, Sanders and Tim Kaine, Clinton's running mate, were the only two senators who refrained from voting to override Obama's veto. Senator Harry Reid was the sole "No" vote.

In March 2018, a US judge allowed a suit to move forward against Saudi Arabia brought by 9/11 survivors and victims' families, that the government should pay billions of dollars in damages to victims.

Operation Encore 
Operation Encore was an FBI investigation into Saudi Arabian links to the September 11 attacks. Circumstantial evidence was uncovered but no direct links were established. Potential leads were not initially pursued and some FBI agents believe that the CIA interfered with its attempt to place two Saudis under surveillance.

See also
 Saudi Arabia and state-sponsored terrorism
 Justice Against Sponsors of Terrorism Act
 Zacarias Moussaoui

References

2016 in Saudi Arabia
2016 in the United States
Allegations
Presidency of Barack Obama
September 11 attacks
Obama administration controversies
Controversies in Saudi Arabia
2016 controversies in the United States
9/11 conspiracy theories